Andrej Lovás (born 28 May 1991) is a Slovak footballer who plays as a forward or a winger for OFK Malženice.

Club career
Lovás made his league debut for Ružomberok on 27 May 2008 against Banská Bystrica.

In September 2019, Lovás joined OFK Malženice.

Honours 
Spartak Trnava
 Slovak Super Liga: 2017–18
 Slovak Cup: 2018–19

References

External links
 at mfkruzomberok.sk 

1991 births
Living people
Slovak footballers
Association football forwards
MFK Ružomberok players
FC Spartak Trnava players
Slovak Super Liga players
Sportspeople from Ružomberok